Trno is a small settlement to the east of Kalobje in the Municipality of Šentjur, eastern Slovenia. The settlement, and the entire municipality, are included in the Savinja Statistical Region, which is in the Slovenian portion of the historical Duchy of Styria.

References

External links
Trno at Geopedia

Populated places in the Municipality of Šentjur